Aghasin, also rendered as Aqasin, may refer to:

 Aghasin-e Bala, a village in Hormozgan Province, Iran
 Aghasin-e Pain, a village in Hormozgan Province, Iran

See also 
 Agassi, a surname
 Agha (disambiguation)
 Aghasi (name), a given name and surname
 Aqasi, a given name and surname